The Crags are a rock band based in Geneva, Switzerland, created in 2009. Their influences are mainly English-singing rock and pop music, going from vintage to actual sounding bands. The band is also known under its previous name "Drama" (2004-2009).

Members 
 Sly Sullivan : Vocals, Guitar
 Phil Wyre : Hammond Organ
 Stan Galaad : Drums

Former members 
 John Pash : Guitar, Vocal (2009-2013)
 Oscar Martensson : Bass (2009-2018)
 Bloody Matt Anderson : Guitar, Vocals (2013-2021)

History 
The band rose from the ashes of its previous line-up, then called Drama. Formed in 2004, the band published a first album in 2006 named A morning after..., from which one of its songs was spotted and regularly broadcast on local Swiss radio station Couleur 3. From that point, the band started gigging on regular bases, mainly in the French speaking part of Switzerland and nearby France.

In 2009, "Drama" became "The Crags" after a member change in the band and recorded a new twelve song LP the same year. This new step was followed by numerous live performances, including the Montreux Jazz Festival 2010 (Music in the park), Rock en Stock 2010 Festival (Pas-de-Calais, Northern France), a gig in London, the 2011 Balélec Festival and also regular airplay on Swiss radio couleur 3, leading to a TV performance on musical program "Musicomax", on Swiss national television station RTS.

In 2012, the band published a new 4 song EP named Loola Loola ! on vinyl format. The downloadable version of this record became available in different ways through Bandcamp, iTunes or Amazon mp3.

In June 2014, a new EP was recorded and published, The universal part of love which constituted the following up to the previous EP, under CD format this time. This one included the four songs of the Loola Loola record, completed with six new songs, recorded at Rec studios in Geneva, in April of the same year.

A musical video clip was shot on that occasion for the song "barrel of a gun"; a single which also got regular airplay on Swiss radio stations once the CD was released. The publicizing of this new record led to a series of concerts, including festivals, such as Caribana Festival (whom which the band shared the bill that evening with bands such as Queens of the Stone Age, Miles Kane, Kodaline) and the Mardisablés Festival.

During the writing process of a new album, a new song named "Please, sniff the air" was recorded in June 2015 and released at the end of August of the same year, along with its musical video clip on YouTube, for free via the usual musical platforms.

By the end of September 2017, the band strikes again with a new album, "Overgrown", which includes eleven new songs. This one is recorded in April of the same year and comes out as a 7" LP and cd also. The outcome of the new record is simultaneously the start of the band's collaboration with Geneva's indie record label Urgence Disk, which also contributes to this publishing. Two singles from the new album, "Artefact" and "Frequency", were published the previous month on YouTube along with a musical clip. In order to promote the new record, the band will then play more than twenty live shows on a one year period, mainly in Switzerland, but also including a few gigs in Eastern Europe in their tour.

After a line-up change, the band became a trio and is, to this day, working on the writing of a new album, due to be published in the year of 2023.

Discography 
 A Morning After... (Drama) 2006
 The Crags  2009
 Loola Loola !  2012
 The universal part of love  2014
 Overgrown  2017

External links 
 Band's page on MX3
 Youtube channel
 Vidéo of "Navy" (acoustic performance )
 Acoustic live on Geneva TV station Léman Bleu

References 

Musical groups established in 2009
2009 establishments in Switzerland
Swiss rock music groups